The 1969 Cal Poly Mustangs football team represented California Polytechnic State College—now known as California Polytechnic State University, San Luis Obispo—as a member of the California Collegiate Athletic Association (CCAA) during the 1969 NCAA College Division football season. Led by first-year head coach Joe Harper, Cal Poly compiled an overall record of 6–4 with a mark of 2–0 in conference play, winning the CCAA title and beginning a streak of five consecutive CCAA championships. The Mustangs played home games at Mustang Stadium in San Luis Obispo, California.

CCAA football changed significantly in 1969. Three teams—Fresno State, Long Beach State, and Cal State Los Angeles—left the conference and moved up to NCAA University Division competition, joining in the newly-formed Pacific Coast Athletic Association. They were replaced by Cal Poly Pomona and UC Riverside. Cal State Fullerton joined in 1970. Cal Poly Pomona had joined the CCAA in 1967, but its football team was not considered a conference member since they did not play a full slate of conference games in 1967 or 1968.

Schedule

Team players in the NFL
The following Cal Poly Mustangs were selected in the 1970 NFL Draft.

References

Cal Poly
Cal Poly Mustangs football seasons
California Collegiate Athletic Association football champion seasons
Cal Poly Mustangs football